The 1999 IAAF Grand Prix was the fifteenth edition of the annual global series of one-day track and field competitions organized by the International Association of Athletics Federations (IAAF). The series was divided into four levels: 1999 IAAF Golden League, Grand Prix I and Grand Prix II, and IAAF Permit Meetings. There were seven IAAF Golden League meetings, Grand Prix I featured 10 meetings from 25 April to 8 August and Grand Prix II featured 11 meetings from 25 February to 5 September, making a combined total of 28 meetings for the series. Athletes could also score additional points at IAAF Permit Meetings.

Compared to the previous season, the Johannesburg meet was replaced by Roodepoort, and the Tsiklitiria meet in Greece and Weltklasse in Köln in Germany were included for the first time. The Qatar International Athletic Meet was promoted to Grand Prix I status and the Paris Meeting Gaz de France was promoted to IAAF Golden League status. The British Grand Prix meet moved from Sheffield to London.

Performances on designated events on the circuit earned athletes points which qualified them for entry to the 1999 IAAF Grand Prix Final, held on 11 September in Munich, Germany. Steeplechaser Bernard Barmasai was the points leader for the series, taking 111 points from eight meetings (a new record for the series). The highest scoring female athletes were distance runners Gabriela Szabo and Maria Mutola, both of whom scored 108 points. Greek men's javelin thrower Konstadinos Gatsioudis had the second highest individual score with 109.

Meetings

Points standings

Overall men

Overall women

References

Points standings
1999 GRAND PRIX STANDINGS - Overall Men. IAAF. Retrieved 2019-08-31.
1999 GRAND PRIX STANDINGS - Overall Women. IAAF. Retrieved 2019-08-31. 

1999
IAAF Grand Prix